The 1976 Rhode Island Rams football team was an American football team that represented the University of Rhode Island in the Yankee Conference during the 1976 NCAA Division II football season. In their first season under head coach Bob Griffin, the Rams compiled a 3–5 record (2–3 against conference opponents) and finished in a tie for third place in the conference.

Schedule

References

Rhode Island
Rhode Island Rams football seasons
1976 in sports in Rhode Island